The 1901 Richmond Spiders football team was an American football team that represented Richmond College—now known as the University of Richmond—as an independent during the 1901 college football season. Led by Garnett Nelson in his first and only year as head coach, Richmond compiled a record of 1–7.

Schedule

References

Richmond
Richmond Spiders football seasons
Richmond Spiders football